James Steven Sadwith (born October 20, 1952) is an American producer, screenwriter, and Emmy Award-winning film director. His films have won or been nominated for over 30 Emmy and Golden Globe awards. He is best known for directing the television movie In Broad Daylight (1991), the miniseries Sinatra (1992) and Elvis (2005), and the feature film Coming Through the Rye (2015).

In 2018, he became a film professor at the Savannah College of Art and Design.

External links

References 

American film directors
American male screenwriters
Primetime Emmy Award winners
Living people
Hotchkiss School alumni
1952 births
Place of birth missing (living people)
Screenwriters from Connecticut
Film producers from Connecticut